Wattier is a surname. Notable people with the surname include:

 Eugène Wattier (1914–1974), French weightlifter
 Johanna Wattier (1762–1827), Dutch actress

See also
 Wattie